The Battle of Tinian was a battle of the Pacific campaign of World War II, fought on the island of Tinian in the Mariana Islands from 24 July until 1 August 1944. The 8,000-man Japanese garrison was eliminated, and the island joined Saipan and Guam as a base for the Twentieth Air Force.

Background

A two-prong attack through the Central Pacific and the Philippines was adopted at the 1943 Cairo Conference. Operation Granite II, was a U.S. Navy devised strategy of island hopping, calling for the seizure of Saipan, Tinian and Guam. The Gilbert and Marshall Islands had been seized by the summer of 1944, while some Japanese garrisons were left to starve. Following the conclusion of the Battle of Saipan on 9 July, the US began preparations for attacking nearby Tinian.

Tinian was part of Japan's South Seas Mandate. By June 1944, it had a population of 15,700 Japanese civilians, including 2,700 ethnic Koreans and 22 ethnic Chamorro.

The Japanese defending the island, the 50th Infantry Regiment, which was originally part of 29th Division, were commanded by Colonel Kiyochi Ogata. On May 12, 1943, there were also 2,349 Marines of the 3rd Special Base Force (第 3 特別 根 地 隊, Dai-3 Tokubetsu Konkyochitai) and 950 marines of the 56th Naval Guards, who had been transferred there from Truk. These soldiers were under the command of Kaigun-Taisa Goichi Oie. The naval forces took over the defense of the airfields, as they belonged to the facilities of naval aviation. The Japanese naval troops also took over all the heavy artillery guns around the airfields and the 39 heavy anti-aircraft guns, which were set up directly around the slopes. In addition, there were construction crews, flight technicians and staff, so that a total of about 4,110 soldiers of various units defended the airfields. Vice-Admiral Kakuji Kakuta, commander of First Air Fleet, was headquartered in Manila, but was on Tinian on an inspection tour when the invasion started. Kakuta exercised no command authority over the army troops on the island and the naval troops were not subject to his direct command.

The US naval bombardment commenced on 16 July, with three battleships, five cruisers and sixteen destroyers. The battleship  and the destroyer  were both hit by 150mm Japanese shore batteries. Colorado was hit 22 times, killing 43 men and wounding 198. Norman Scott was hit six times, killing the captain, Seymore Owens, and 18 of his seamen, plus wounding 47.

Battle
The 4th Marine Division landed on 24 July 1944, supported by naval bombardment and marine artillery firing across the strait from Saipan. With the help of the Seabees, the Marines were able to land along the Northwest coast with its two small beaches and low coral. Commodore Paul J. Halloran (CEC) Seabee theater commander provided drawings of a conceptual landing ramp for the 18th and 121st Construction Battalions to fabricate. To construct these ramps, the plans called for the Seabees to mount steel beams salvaged from Saipan's abandoned sugar mill on LVT-2s. If they worked they would allow the Marines to outflank Tinian's prepared defenses. General Harry Schmidt was skeptical and ordered that the ramps be put through a 100-vehicle use test. The Seabee creation was named a Doodlebug. It worked exactly as the Marines had hoped. A successful feint for the major settlement of Tinian town diverted defenders from the actual landing site on the north of the island. The feint withstood a series of night counterattacks supported by tanks and the 2nd Marine Division landed the next day.

Another piece of Seabee handiwork was brought across from Saipan: the 24 "Satan" mechanized flamethrowers that General Holland Smith USMC had requested from the Army's CWS Flame Tank Group in Hawaii. The terrain on Tinian was much more conducive to their use than Saipan. Saipan and Tinian served as training grounds for the tank crews and proving grounds for the Marine Corps.

The weather worsened on 28 July, damaging the pontoon causeways and interrupting the unloading of supplies. By 29 July, the Americans had captured half the island, and on 30 July, the 4th Marine Division occupied Tinian town and Airfield No. 4.

Japanese remnants made a final stand in the caves and ravines of a limestone ridge on the south portion of the island, making probes and counterattacks into the Marine lines. Resistance continued through 3 August, with some civilians murdered by the Japanese.

Aftermath
By 10 August 1944, 13,000 Japanese civilians were interned, but up to 4,000 were dead through suicide, murdered by Japanese troops, or killed in combat.
The garrison on Aguiguan Island off the southwest cape of Tinian, commanded by Lieutenant Kinichi Yamada, held out until the end of the war, surrendering on 4 September 1945. The last holdout on Tinian, Murata Susumu, was captured in 1953.

After the battle, Tinian became an important base for further US operations in the Pacific campaign. Camps were built for 50,000 troops. Fifteen thousand Seabees turned the island into the busiest airfield of the war, with six  runways for attacks by United States Army Air Forces B-29 Superfortress bombers on enemy targets in the Philippines, the Ryukyu Islands, and mainland Japan, including the March 9/10 1945 Operation Meetinghouse firebombing of Tokyo and the atomic bombings of Hiroshima and Nagasaki. North Field was built over Airfields No. 1 and 3, and became operational in February 1945, while West Field was built over Airfield No. 2, and became operational in March 1945.

Four 1,000-bed hospitals (110, 111, 112 and 113) were planned and located in preparation for the invasion of Japan. None were actually built, as the Japanese surrendered after the atomic bombs were dropped, which thus ended the need for the hospitals.

See also
 North Field (Tinian)
 West Field (Tinian)
 Tinian Naval Base

Notes

References

Further reading

External links

Tinian
Tinian
Tinian
History of the Northern Mariana Islands
United States Marine Corps in World War II
Amphibious operations of World War II
July 1944 events
August 1944 events
Amphibious operations involving the United States